The 2014 Russian Artistic Gymnastics Championships will be held in Penza, Russia from April 3 to April 6 for WAG and April 10 to April 13 for MAG.

Medal winners

Schedule of events 
Wednesday, April 2
 12:00 – 13:50 Jr. Team Final (Subdivision 1) 
 14:00 – 15:50 Jr. Team Final (Subdivision 2)
Thursday, April 3
 12:00 – 13:50 Sr. All-Around Final (Subdivision 1)
 14:00 – 15:50 Sr. All-Around Final (Subdivision 2)
Friday, April 4
 11:00 – 12:30 Jr. All-Around Final(CMS)
 12:45 – 14:15 Jr. All-Around Final(MS)
Saturday, April 5
 11:00 – 12:30 Sr. Team Final
Sunday, April 6
 11:00 – Event Final

Start List

Results

Senior Team Final

Senior All-Around 
Senior Team members Viktoria Kuzmina and Evgenia Shelgunova didn't attend.
Senior Reserve members Evgenia Zhukova, Evgenia Korolkova, Kristina Levshina and Anastasia Marchuk didn't attend.

Senior Vault Final

Senior Uneven Bars Final

Senior Balance Beam Final

Senior Floor Exercise Final

Junior Team Final 
Junior Team members Anastasia Ilyankova, Natalia Kapitonova and Alena Chernova didn't attend.
Junior Reserve members Raisa Batyrova, Viktoria Bykova and Maria Iontef didn't attend.

Junior All-Around (MS)

Junior All-Around (CMS)

Junior Vault Final (MC)

Junior Uneven Bars Final (MC)

Junior Balance Beam Final (MC)

Junior Floor Exercise Final (MC)

Junior Vault Final (KMC)

Junior Uneven Bars Final (KMC)

Junior Balance Beam Final (KMC)

Junior Floor Exercise Final (KMC)

Youth All-Around Final (1st Level)

Youth All-Around Final (2nd Level)

Youth Vault Final (1st Level)

Youth Uneven Bars Final (1st Level)

Youth Balance Beam Final (1st Level)

Youth Floor Exercise Final (1st Level)

Youth Vault Final (2nd Level)

Youth Uneven Bars Final (2nd Level)

Youth Balance Beam Final (2nd Level)

Youth Floor Exercise Final (2nd Level)

European Championships team selections 
The team to the 2014 European Women's Artistic Gymnastics Championships was announced in April 2014.

External links
  Official site

2014 in gymnastics
Artistic Gymnastics Championships
Russian Artistic Gymnastics Championships
April 2014 sports events in Russia